U.S. Highway 287 (US 287) in the U.S. state of Texas is a major U.S. Highway that begins on the Gulf Coast in Port Arthur and heads north through Fort Worth, northwest to Childress, Clarendon, Wichita Falls, and Amarillo in the Texas Panhandle and into Oklahoma near Kerrick.

Route description 
US 287 begins at the intersection of Woodworth Boulevard and SH 87 in Port Arthur and runs northwest, running concurrent with US 69 and US 96. At the cloverleaf interchange with SH 73, the route becomes a freeway and remains so heading towards I-10 in Beaumont. It runs concurrent with I-10 heading through Beaumont until separating from the interstate north of the city. In Lumberton, US 287 separates from US 96, remaining concurrent with US 69 until reaching Woodville, where it splits after intersecting US 190.

The highway continues northwest, running through Chester and intersecting US 59 in Corrigan. In Crockett, US 287 becomes concurrent with SH 19 and remains so until reaching Palestine, where it splits from the state highway northwest of town. The route continues west, passing by the Richland-Chambers Reservoir until reaching I-45 in Corsicana. It remains concurrent with I-45 until reaching exit 247 southeast of Ennis and heading west. In Waxahachie, the highway interchanges US 77 and I-35E.

In Midlothian, it interchanges with US 67 before continuing northwest as a freeway towards the Dallas–Fort Worth metroplex, heading through Mansfield. The highway then runs northwest toward Fort Worth, also known as the Martin Luther King Jr. Freeway. Near downtown Fort Worth, the highway interchanges with I-30 and runs concurrent with Spur 280 until reaching I-35W, where it runs concurrent with it until exit 60 north of I-820.

The route continues northwest, running concurrent with US 81 and remains as a freeway. It then runs through Decatur and interchanges US 380. It continues northwest until separating from US 81 in Bowie. In Henrietta, US 287 becomes concurrent with US 82. In Wichita Falls, the route interchanges and becomes concurrent with US 281 and becomes concurrent as well as US 277 heading through the city. US 82 splits from US 287 at the US 277 interchange. I-44 begins at Bellevue Park and the route remains concurrent with it until reaching Spur 325, where it becomes independent while US 277 and US 281 remains concurrent with I-44. The highway then passes through Iowa Park, Electra, and Harrold. In Oklaunion, the route becomes concurrent with US 183 and US 70. US 183 separates at the US 283 interchange and US 70 separates from US 287 west of Vernon. The highway continues northwest, heading toward Amarillo. In Childress, the highway intersects US 62 and US 83.

Between Childress and Amarillo, US 287 passes through Estelline.

In Amarillo, the highway runs concurrent with I-40 until reaching I-27, becoming concurrent with US 60 and US 87 heading through downtown. US 60 becomes concurrent with I-40 Business while US 87 and US 287 continues north. US 287 splits from US 87 in Dumas. The highway continues north through Cactus and intersects US 54 in Stratford. The route continues northwest and crosses into Oklahoma from Kerrick.

History
When US 287 was first commissioned in 1935, none of its route was in Texas.  The route was extended southward from Colorado to the Gulf Coast at Port Arthur, Texas in 1939.  Before this extension, the portion from the Oklahoma state line to Amarillo was SH 9, from Amarillo to Henrietta was SH 5, Henrietta to Bowie was SH 50, Bowie to Fort Worth was SH 2 and US 81, Fort Worth to Ennis SH 34, Ennis to Corsicana was SH 14/US 75, Corsicana to Palestine was SH 22, Palestine to Crockett was SH 19, Crockett and Woodville was Texas State Highway 106, Woodville to Port Arthur was SH 8.

From 1926 to 1939, the aforementioned state routes between US 66 in Claude and US 81 in Bowie were co-designated with U.S. Route 370, which was commissioned in 1926.  US 370 was extended westward to Amarillo by 1935 with the northward relocation of US 66.  This route also traveled concurrently with US 70 between Vernon and Wichita Falls, Texas.   
With the 1939 general re-description of the Texas State Highway system all of the state highway designations were removed and US 370 was decommissioned from Oklahoma state line to Port Arthur. SH 106 was decommissioned entirely.

Future

Currently in Beaumont a construction project is widening the highway from four lanes to six lanes for a future Interstate Corridor for US 96 to connect to future Interstate 14. Between Ennis and Waxahachie the highway is getting grade separated interchanges and service roads.

Major intersections

Notes

Image gallery

See also

References

External links

US 287 southeast of downtown Fort Worth—from dfwfreeways.info

87-2
 Texas
Transportation in Jefferson County, Texas
Transportation in Hardin County, Texas
Transportation in Tyler County, Texas
Transportation in Polk County, Texas
Transportation in Trinity County, Texas
Transportation in Houston County, Texas
Transportation in Anderson County, Texas
Transportation in Freestone County, Texas
Transportation in Navarro County, Texas
Transportation in Ellis County, Texas
Transportation in Johnson County, Texas
Transportation in Tarrant County, Texas
Transportation in Wise County, Texas
Transportation in Montague County, Texas
Transportation in Clay County, Texas
Transportation in Wichita County, Texas
Transportation in Wilbarger County, Texas
Transportation in Hardeman County, Texas
Transportation in Childress County, Texas
Transportation in Hall County, Texas
Transportation in Donley County, Texas
Transportation in Armstrong County, Texas
Transportation in Carson County, Texas
Transportation in Potter County, Texas
Transportation in Moore County, Texas
Transportation in Sherman County, Texas
Transportation in Dallam County, Texas
1942 establishments in Texas